Live from Memphis is a live promotional recording by rock band Wishbone Ash. The promotional recording featured only a few tracks and was only released in America. The entire EP was included as bonus tracks on the 2002 remastered version of Argus (1972).

Track listings

Side one
 "Jail Bait" – 4:57
 "The Pilgrim" – 10:10

Side two
 "Phoenix" – 17:05 (also included as bonus track on 1992 US release of Live Dates)

Personnel
Wishbone Ash
 Andy Powell – guitar, vocals
 Ted Turner – guitar, vocals
 Martin Turner – bass guitar, vocals
 Steve Upton – drums

References

1972 live albums
Wishbone Ash live albums